The 1981 Railway Cup Hurling Championship was the 55th staging of the Railway Cup since its establishment by the Gaelic Athletic Association in 1927. The cup began on 1 March 1981 and ended on 17 March 1981.

Connacht were the defending champions, however, they were beaten by Leinster in the semi-final.

On 17 March 1981, Munster won the cup after a 2-16 to 2–06 defeat of Leinster in the final at Cusack Park. This was their 35th Railway Cup title overall and their first title since 1978.

Results

Semi-finals

Final

Scoring statistics

Top scorers overall

J McKenna     10
P Delaney     8
P Horgan      8

Bibliography

 Donegan, Des, The Complete Handbook of Gaelic Games (DBA Publications Limited, 2005).

References

Railway Cup Hurling Championship
Railway Cup Hurling Championship
Hurling